Dark Places is a 1973 British psychological horror film directed by Don Sharp and starring Robert Hardy, Christopher Lee, Joan Collins and Herbert Lom.

Plot
After the previous owner Andrew Marr dies, Edward Foster inherits his mansion. Despite attempts to scare him out of the house, that is rumoured to be haunted, he decides to renovate and inhabit it.
Unbeknownst to him, Marr’s former physician Dr Ian Mandeville and his sister Sarah compete with solicitor Prescott in trying to locate two suitcases of money rumoured to be hidden on the large estate, that he hopes to claim for himself.

Edward, later revealed to have been recently released from an asylum, soon starts hearing voices and begins to have flashbacks of the life of Andrew Marr, slowly witnessing the latter’s marriage to his mentally unstable wife Victoria fall apart. Andrew had planned to leave her for the younger and more attractive governess Alta. In desperation Victoria had encouraged the two equally psychotic children to murder the governess whilst she attempted to seduce Andrew in the bedroom. Hearing the children murder Alta, Andrew strangled his wife and killed the children with a sword before bricking all four corpses up behind a wall with the two cases of money.

Edward, driven mad by the constant flashbacks and unable to distinguish between himself and Andrew, accidentally strangles Sarah while experiencing the murder of Andrew’s wife. He kills Dr Mandeville with a pick axe and attempts to kill Prescott before being arrested and led away by police, who also seize the money.

Cast
 Christopher Lee - Doctor Ian Mandeville 
 Joan Collins - Sarah Mandeville 
 Herbert Lom - Prescott 
 Jane Birkin - Alta 
 Robert Hardy - Edward Foster / Andrew Marr 
 Jean Marsh - Victoria
 Carleton Hobbs - Old Marr 
 Roy Evans - Baxter 
 Martin Boddey - Sgt. Riley 
 John Glyn-Jones - Bank Manager
 John Levene - Doctor 
 Jennifer Thanisch - Jessica 
 Michael McVey - Francis 
 Barry Linehan - Asylum Gatekeeper

Production
Don Sharp was under contract to a studio at the time, Scotia, who loaned him out to make this film. He said "apart from one slow sequence" near the beginning, the movie "had some super stuff". Sharp said it was "a very strange production all the way through" in part because producer James Hannah was eccentric. "Nobody could figure out why he was making a movie," recalled Sharp, who said there were rumours the film was being made as a tax loss.

The film was shot at an old asylum near Uxbridge.

Release
There were delays in releasing the film. "There were rumours it had disappeared," said Sharp, who said twenty years after filming was completed he started receiving cheques from the film being sold to cable in Switzerland.

Home media
The film was released for the first time on DVD by Film 2000 on 20 November 2006.

Reception

TV Guide awarded the film 1/5 stars, calling it 'mediocre in all respects'. Dave Sindelar from Fantastic Movie Musings and Ramblings gave the film a negative review, criticizing the film's "sluggish" pacing, repetition, and final act. Sindelar did however, commend the film's performances.

References

External links
 
 
 

1973 films
1973 horror films
1970s horror thriller films
British horror thriller films
Films directed by Don Sharp
Films set in psychiatric hospitals
1970s English-language films
1970s British films